

General Information
The BAHD acyltransferases are a super family of enzymes found primarily in plants, algae and bacteria. They are CoA-dependent enzymes that transfer acylated moieties (RC(O)R’) of an acyl-activated CoA thioester donor to an acceptor molecule (D’Auria, 2006). Members of this enzyme family typically share two conserved amino acid motifs. The first motif, or string of consecutive amino acids, is HXXXD (Histidine, Any, Any, Any, Aspartic acid) and it is typically found in the central region of the protein. The Histidine in this motif has also been shown to act as a catalytic residue in many BAHD enzymes. The second conserved motif is DFGWG (Aspartic acid, Phenylalanine, Glycine, Tryptophan, Glycine) and it is typically found near the carboxyl terminus of the protein and is thought to participate in CoA binding (D'Auria, 2006). Additionally, further information such as currently discovered structures, sequences and gene architecture on the transferase family of enzymes (which includes BAHDs) can be found at the Pfam link for the Transferase Family.  

Phylogenetic analysis using full-length amino acid sequences of functionally characterized BAHD enzymes by D’Auria (2006) and Stewart et al. (2005) shows that they form five distinctive clades that correlate to general function. BAHDs typically have low substrate selectivity, and can use a variety of CoA thioester and alcohol co-substrates such as such as anthocyanins, aromatic and aliphatic alcohols and amines, glycosides, terpenoids and alkaloids (D'Auria, 2006). The acronym BAHD refers to the first letter of the first four enzymes that were discovered to belong to this family.

 B:  Benzyl alcohol O-acetyltransferase (BEAT), an acetyltransferase from the California wild flower Clarkia breweri, also known as ‘Fairy Fans’ and as ‘Brewer's Clarkia’. It is required for synthesis of the floral volatile benzyl acetate in this species (Dudareva et al., 1998). 

 A: The letter ‘A’ refers to anthocyanin O-hydroxycinnamoyltransferase (AHCT), a benzoyl/hydroxycinnamoyl-CoA acyltransferase identified in Gentiana triflora and is believed to be involved in the synthesis of acylated anthocyanins responsible for floral pigmentation (Fujiwara et al., 1997). 

 H represents N-hydroxycinnamoyl/benzoyltransferase (HCBT), also a benzoyl/hydroxycinnamoyl-CoA acyltransferase identified in carnation (Dianthus caryophyllus). It is thought to be required for synthesis of a class of phytoalexins known as anthramides (Yang et al., 1997). 

 D corresponds to deacetylvindoline 4-O-acetyltransferase (DAT), an acetyltransferase of the species Catharanthus roseus also known as ‘Madagascar Periwinkle’. This enzyme is involved in the synthesis of the alkaloid vindoline (St. Pierre et al. 1998). 
  
In plants, BAHD acyltransferases are often involved in the production of phenolic secondary metabolites, for example in Poplar (Populus trichocarpa) at least two BAHD acyltransferases are required for the production of potent defence/anti-herbivory compounds known as the salicinoid phenolic glycosides (Chedgy et al., 2015). These are benzoyl-CoA:benzyl alcohol O-benzoyltransferase (PtBEBT) that produces benzyl benzoate from benzoyl-CoA and benzyl alcohol (Chedgy et al., 2015), and benzoyl-CoA:salicyl alcohol O-benzoyltransferase (PtSABT) that produces salicyl benzoate from benzoyl-CoA and salicyl alcohol (Chedgy et al., 2015).

References
D'Auria, John C (2006) Acyltransferases in plants: a good time to be BAHD. Curr Opin Plant Biol 9: 331-340. DOI: 10.1016/j.pbi.2006.03.016
Stewart, Charles Jr; Kang, Byoung-Cheorl; Liu, Kede; Mazourek, Michael; Moore, Shanna L; Yoo, Eun Young; Kim, Byung-Dong; Paran, Ilan; Jahn, Molly M (2005) The Pun1 gene for pungency in pepper encodes a putative acyltransferase. Plant J 42: 675-688. DOI: 10.1111/j.1365-313X.2005.02410.x
Dudareva, Natalia; D'Auria, John C; Nam, Kyoung Hee; Raguso, Robert A; Pichersky, Eran (1998) Acetyl-CoA:benzylalcohol acetyltransferase - an enzyme involved in floral scent production in Clarkia breweri. Plant J 14: 297-304. DOI: 10.1046/j.1365-313X.1998.00121.x
Fujiwara, Hiroyuki; Tanaka, Yoshikazu; Fukui, Yuko; Nakao, Masahiro; Ashikari, Toshihiko; Kusumi, Takaaki (1997) Anthocyanin 5-aromatic acyltransferase from Gentiana triflora. Purification, characterization and its role in anthocyanin biosynthesis. Eur J Biochem 249: 45-51. DOI: 10.1111/j.1432-1033.1997.t01-1-00045.x
Yang, Qian; Reinhard, Klaus; Schiltz, Emile; Matern, Ulrich (1997) Characterization and heterologous expression of hydroxycinnamoyl/benzoyl-CoA:anthranilate N-hydroxycinnamoyl/benzoyltransferase from elicited cell cultures of carnation, Dianthus caryophyllus L. Plant Mol Biol 35:777-789. DOI: 10.1023/A:1005878622437
St. Pierre, Benoit; Laflamme, Pierre; Alarco, Anne-Marie; De Luca, Vincenzo (1998) The terminal O-acetyltransferase involved in vindoline biosynthesis defines a new class of proteins responsible for coenzyme A dependent acyl transfer. Plant J 14: 703-713. DOI: 10.1046/j.1365-313x.1998.00174.x
Chedgy, Russell J; Köllner, Tobias G; Constabel, C Peter (2015) Functional characterization of two acyltransferases from Populus trichocarpa capable of synthesizing benzyl benzoate and salicyl benzoate, potential intermediates in salicinoid phenolic glycoside biosynthesis. Phytochemistry 113: 149-159. DOI:10.1016/j.phytochem.2014.10.018

Enzymes